Trypetoptera is a genus of marsh flies in the family Sciomyzidae. There are at least two described species in Trypetoptera.

Species
T. canadensis (Macquart, 1843)
T. punctulata (Scopoli, 1763)

References

Further reading

External links

 

Sciomyzidae